Politeama Rossetti is an Italian theatre situated in the city of Trieste. With over 60 shows scheduled each season, running from October to June, its stage shows include plays, musicals, ballet, dance and rock concerts.

It is the home of Teatro Stabile del Friuli Venezia Giulia, one of Italy's major public theatres. The artistic director is Antonio Calenda.

The theatre was built in 1878 and designed by Nicolò Bruno. It was heavily restored in 1928, 1969 and 1999. While the original capacity was over 5,000, it can now sit 1,531.

In the recent years the theatre has specialised in the presentation of major West End and Broadway musicals, including the original productions of Cats in 2008, Mamma Mia!, The Rocky Horror Show  and Chicago in 2009. In 2010 the theatre staged We Will Rock You, featuring the music of Queen, the acclaimed 50th anniversary production of West Side Story and Andrew Lloyd Webber’s Evita. In 2011 the theatre hosted the Italian premieres of the musicals Chess and Spamalot.

References 

Theatres in Italy
Buildings and structures in Trieste
Tourist attractions in Friuli-Venezia Giulia